"Ego Is Not a Dirty Word" is a song by Australian band Skyhooks, released in April 1975 as the lead single from the band's second studio album of the same name. It was written by the group's bass guitarist, Greg Macainsh and was produced by Ross Wilson. The song peaked at number two in Australia. 

The lyrics of the song discuss - inter alia - the egos of Jesus and Richard Nixon.

In 2010, The song was described by The Australian as a "Skyhooks classic... with a strong beat and annoying tune."

Track listing
7" single (K-5891)
 Side A "Ego Is Not a Dirty Word" - 3:00
 Side B "Every Chase a Steeple" - 3:42

Charts

Weekly charts

Year-end charts

References 

1975 singles
Mushroom Records singles
1975 songs
Songs written by Greg Macainsh
Skyhooks (band) songs